The Prince George Spruce Kings are a junior "A" ice hockey team based in Prince George, British Columbia, Canada. They are members of the Mainland Division of the British Columbia Hockey League (BCHL). They play their home games at Kopar Memorial Arena, which has a capacity of 2,112. The Spruce Kings won their first Fred Page Cup in the 2018/2019 BCHL Season. The Spruce Kings had a playoff record of 16-1, sweeping the last 3 playoff rounds, including the championship series.

History
Founded in 1972, the Spruce Kings originally were a part of the Pacific Northwest Hockey League.  In 1975, the Spruce Kings and the neighboring Quesnel Millionaires joined the Peace Junior B Hockey League, which renamed itself the Peace-Cariboo Junior Hockey League. In 1980, the league was promoted to Junior A and the Spruce Kings won the league's first Junior A championship. From 1980 until 1996, the Kings won nine league titles.  In 1981, the Spruce Kings defeated Fort St. John Golden Hawks 4-games-to-3 to claim their first Junior A title.

In 1994, the Royal City Outlaws had joined the British Columbia Hockey League as an expansion franchise. In 1996, the Spruce Kings bought out the BCHL rights of the Outlaws, using the rights to move the Spruce Kings into the BCHL.

The Prince George Spruce Kings hosted the Royal Bank Cup in 2007. They lost in an anticlimactic final after surviving a record-setting quintuple overtime match in the semi-final versus the Camrose Kodiaks. Spruce King goalie Jordan White made 91 saves in the 3–2 victory. At 146 minutes, it was the longest game in Royal Bank Cup history.

Season-by-season record
Note: GP = Games Played, W = Wins, L = Losses, T = Ties, OTL = Overtime Losses, GF = Goals for, GA = Goals against

Playoffs
1981 Won League, Lost Mowat Cup
Prince George Spruce Kings defeated Dawson Creek Kodiaks 4-games-to-2
Prince George Spruce Kings defeated Fort St. John Golden Hawks 4-games-to-3 PCJHL CHAMPIONS
Penticton Knights (BCJHL) defeated Prince George Spruce Kings 2-games-to-none
1982 Won League, Lost Mowat Cup
Prince George Spruce Kings defeated Fort St. John Huskies 4-games-to-3
Prince George Spruce Kings defeated Grande Prairie North Stars 4-games-to-1 PCJHL CHAMPIONS
Penticton Knights (BCJHL) defeated Prince George Spruce Kings 2-games-to-none
1983 Lost Semi-final
Quesnel Millionaires defeated Prince George Spruce Kings 3-games-to-1
Dawson Creek Kodiaks defeated Prince George Spruce Kings 3-games-to-2
1984 Won League, Lost Mowat Cup
Prince George Spruce Kings defeated Quesnel Millionaires 4-games-to-1
Prince George Spruce Kings defeated Williams Lake Mustangs 4-games-to-1 PCJHL CHAMPIONS
Langley Eagles (BCJHL) defeated Prince George Spruce Kings 2-games-to-none
1985 Won League, Lost Mowat Cup
Prince George Spruce Kings defeated Williams Lake Mustangs 4-games-to-none
Prince George Spruce Kings defeated Fort St. John Huskies 4-games-to-none PCJHL CHAMPIONS
Penticton Knights (BCJHL) defeated Prince George Spruce Kings 2-games-to-none
1986 Won League, Lost Mowat Cup
Prince George Spruce Kings defeated Grande Prairie North Stars 4-games-to-none
Prince George Spruce Kings defeated Williams Lake Mustangs 4-games-to-1 PCJHL CHAMPIONS
Penticton Knights (BCJHL) defeated Prince George Spruce Kings 2-games-to-none
1987 Lost Semi-final
Quesnel Millionaires defeated Prince George Spruce Kings 4-games-to-2
1988 Lost Final
Prince George Spruce Kings defeated Quesnel Millionaires 4-games-to-none
Grande Prairie North Stars defeated Prince George Spruce Kings 4-games-to-3
1989 Lost Semi-final
Grande Prairie North Stars defeated Prince George Spruce Kings 4-games-to-1
1990 Won League, Lost Mowat Cup
Prince George Spruce Kings defeated Williams Lake Mustangs 4-games-to-1
Prince George Spruce Kings defeated Fort St. John Huskies 4-games-to-none PCJHL CHAMPIONS
New Westminster Royals (BCJHL) defeated Prince George Spruce Kings 3-games-to-none
1991 Won League, Lost Mowat Cup
Prince George Spruce Kings advance to final due to DQ of Quesnel Millionaires
Prince George Spruce Kings defeated Williams Lake Mustangs 4-games-to-1 PCJHL CHAMPIONS
Vernon Lakers (BCHL) defeated Prince George Spruce Kings 3-games-to-none
1992 Won League, Lost Mowat Cup
Prince George Spruce Kings defeated Quesnel Millionaires 4-games-to-none
Prince George Spruce Kings defeated Fort St. John Huskies 4-games-to-2
Prince George Spruce Kings defeated Trail Smoke Eaters 3-games-to-2 RMJHL CHAMPIONS
Vernon Lakers (BCHL) defeated Prince George Spruce Kings 3-games-to-none
1993 Lost Semifinals
Prince George Spruce Kings defeated Grande Prairie Chiefs 4-games-to-none
Williams Lake Mustangs defeated Prince George Spruce Kings 4-games-to-none
1994 Lost Semifinals
Prince George Spruce Kings defeated Williams Lake Mustangs 4-games-to-none
Fort St. John Huskies defeated Prince George Spruce Kings 4-games-to-2
1995 Lost Final
Prince George Spruce Kings defeated Fort St. John Huskies 4-games-to-none
Prince George Spruce Kings defeated Williams Lake Mustangs 4-games-to-none
Cranbrook Colts defeated Prince George Spruce Kings 4-games-to-2
1996 Won League, Lost Mowat Cup
Prince George Spruce Kings defeated Fort St. John Huskies 4-games-to-1
Prince George Spruce Kings defeated Quesnel Millionaires 4-games-to-1
Prince George Spruce Kings defeated Fernie Ghostriders 4-games-to-1 RMJHL CHAMPIONS
Vernon Vipers (BCHL) defeated Prince George Spruce Kings 3-games-to-none

Royal City Outlaws standings
Starting in 1994, the Outlaws played two seasons in the BCHL.  In 1996, the Spruce Kings bought the rights to the Outlaws' franchise and brought their Rocky Mountain Junior Hockey League team in their place.

Note: GP = Games Played, W = Wins, L = Losses, T = Ties, GF = Goals for, GA = Goals against

See also
List of ice hockey teams in British Columbia

References

External links
 Official website of the Prince George Spruce Kings
 Official website of the BCHL
 Official website of BC Hockey

British Columbia Hockey League teams
Sport in Prince George, British Columbia
Ice hockey teams in British Columbia
1972 establishments in British Columbia
Ice hockey clubs established in 1972